Świebodzin railway station is a railway station serving the town of Świebodzin, in the Lubusz Voivodeship, Poland. The station is located on the Warsaw–Kunowice railway. The train services are operated by PKP and Przewozy Regionalne.

The station was also on the Sulechów–Świebodzin railway, which closed to passenger services in 1988 and freight services in 1990.

Train services
The station is served by the following service(s):

EuroCity services (EC) (EC 95 by DB) (EIC by PKP) Berlin - Frankfurt (Oder) - Rzepin - Poznan - Kutno - Warsaw
EuroCity services (EC) (EC 95 by DB) (IC by PKP) Berlin - Frankfurt (Oder) - Rzepin - Poznan - Bydgoszcz - Gdansk - Gdynia
EuroNight services (EN) Cologne - Duisburg - Dortmund - Berlin - Frankfurt (Oder) - Poznan - Kutno - Warsaw
Regional services (R) Rzepin - Swiebodzin - Zbasynek

References 

 This article is based upon a translation of the Polish language version as of July 2016.

Railway stations in Lubusz Voivodeship
Człuchów County